Timothy Hastings is a former Grand Prix motorcycle racer from Great Britain, who is currently competing in the Scottish Superbike Championship for Team Twister aboard a Kawasaki ZX-6R. He has also competed in the British 125GP Championship, finishing runner-up in the championship in 2008, National Superstock 600 Championship and the British Supersport Championship.

Career statistics

By season

Races by year

References

External links
 Profile on motogp.com

British motorcycle racers
Living people
1992 births
125cc World Championship riders